that's Shanghai is a monthly English-language listings and entertainment magazine published in China. 

As of May 2020, the print magazine had a staff of 30 and a circulation of 62,500 with 40 percent of its readership being expatriates. The magazine's current publisher, JY International Cultural Communications, also publishes that's Beijing and that's PRD (covering the Pearl River Delta).

References

External links
 that's Shanghai

Magazines published in China
Monthly magazines published in China
English-language magazines
Listings magazines
Local interest magazines
Magazines established in 1999
Magazines published in Shanghai
1999 establishments in China